Chevron (often relating to V-shaped patterns) may refer to:

Science and technology 
 Chevron (aerospace), sawtooth patterns on some jet engines
 Chevron (anatomy), a bone
 Eulithis testata, a moth
 Chevron (geology), a fold in rock layers
 Chevron (land form), a sediment deposit across the earth's surface
 Chevron nail, a rare transient fingernail ridge pattern seen in children
 Chevron plot, a way of representing data

Organisations 
 The Chevron, former newspaper at the University of Waterloo, Ontario, Canada
 Chevron Corporation, an American multinational energy corporation
 Chevron U.S.A., Inc. v. Natural Resources Defense Council, Inc., 467 U.S. 837 (1984), a United States Supreme Court case dealing with administrative law
 Chevron Cars Ltd, a British racing car constructor
 Chevron Engineering Ltd, a New Zealand car maker

People 
 Philip Chevron (1957–2013), Irish singer/songwriter
 The Chevrons, an American pop group

Places 
 Chevron, Wallonia, a district of the municipality of Stoumont
 Chevron, Kansas, an unincorporated community, United States
 Chevron, or Hebron, a city in the West Bank 
 Chevron Island, a neighbourhood in Gold Coast, Queensland, Australia 
 Château de Chevron, in France
 Chevron Mountain
 Chevron Reef, artificial reef constructed in 2000 in Santa Monica Bay
 Chevron Rocks
 Chevron Science Center, academic building in Pittsburgh, Pennsylvania
 Estadio Chevron, a professional baseball stadium located in Tijuana, Baja California, in Mexico

Symbols 
 Chevron (insignia), a heraldic symbol
 Guillemet, a type of quotation mark that looks like a pair of small chevrons
 Angle brackets, another pair of punctuation marks sometimes called chevrons
 Trill (music), a wavy line indicating a trill
 Chevron, a symbol used in reticles in firearm scopes like the ACOG
 Rank insignia in many armed forces
 Chevron (flag), a flag pattern
 Circumflex, a chevron-shaped diacritical mark
 Caron/haček, a diacritical mark known as "inverted chevron"

Other uses 
 Chevron, a type of moustache
 Chevron, part of a stargate in the Stargate fictional universe
 "Chevron" (song), from the 2016 album Mariner
 Chevron bead, special glass beads

See also